Terrence Orlando Metcalf (born January 28, 1978) is a former American football player who was a guard in the National Football League (NFL) for seven seasons during the early 2000s. He played college football for the University of Mississippi (Ole Miss), and was recognized as a consensus All-American. The Chicago Bears chose him in the third round of the 2002 NFL Draft. His son DK Metcalf is an All-Pro wide receiver for the Seattle Seahawks.

Early years
Metcalf was born in Clarksdale, Mississippi.  He was named a Parade magazine high school All-American following his senior season at Clarksdale High School.

College career
Metcalf received an athletic scholarship to attend the University of Mississippi, where he played for the Ole Miss Rebels football team from 1998 to 2001.  He was a first-team All-Southeastern Conference (SEC) selection in 2000 and 2001, received second-team All-American honors in 1999, and was recognized as a consensus first-team All-American in 2001.

Professional career

In his seven seasons with the Bears, he appeared in 78 games and started 25 of them.

Personal life
Metcalf was a coach at Pearl River Community College in Poplarville, Mississippi. He served as an assistant coach at Coahoma Community College in his hometown of Clarksdale, and was promoted to interim head football coach on December 13, 2022.  Metcalf was officially named Coahoma’s head football coach on December 27, 2022. 

Metcalf is the father of Seattle Seahawks wide receiver DK Metcalf. He is a member of Phi Beta Sigma fraternity.

References

External links
 Chicago Bears bio

1978 births
Living people
All-American college football players
American football offensive guards
American football offensive tackles
Chicago Bears players
Detroit Lions players
Ole Miss Rebels football players
Sportspeople from Clarksdale, Mississippi
Players of American football from Mississippi